Echo margarita is a species of broad-winged damselfly in the family Calopterygidae.

The IUCN conservation status of Echo margarita is "LC", least concern, with no immediate threat to the species' survival. The IUCN status was reviewed in 2010.

Subspecies
These two subspecies belong to the species Echo margarita:
 Echo margarita margarita
 Echo margarita tripartita Selys, 1879

References

Further reading

 

Calopterygidae
Articles created by Qbugbot
Insects described in 1853